The Health Minister of the State of Palestine (Abbreviation: MOH) is Dr. Mai al-Kaila. The Health Minister heads the Ministry of Health of the State of Palestine, which changed its name from Ministry of Health of the Palestinian National Authority, following the November 29, 2012 vote in UN over upgrade of Palestine to non-member state status.

Minister of Health of the Palestinian National Authority
The Minister of Health of the Palestinian National Authority (Abbreviation: MOH) position was established in 1994 and transformed into the Minister of Health of the State of Palestine, following the November 29, 2012 vote in the UN. Since 2007, an alternative Minister of Health of the Gaza Strip has also been operating in Gaza under Hamas governance. Dr. Hani Adbeen, the 9th Health Minister of the Palestinian Authority became the first Health Minister of the State of Palestine in December 2012.

The following is the list of Health Ministers of the Palestinian National Authority:

 Dr. Hani Abdeen (From 16/05/2012 to 05/06/2013)
 Dr. Fathi Abumoghli (From 17/06/2007 to 13/05/2012)
 Dr. Rodwan Akhras (From 17/03/2007 to  14/06/2007)
 Dr. Basem Naem (From 29/03/2006 to 17/03/2007)
 Dr. Thehny Wuhaidi (From 24/02/2005 to 27/03/2006)
 Dr. Jawad Tibi (From 07/10/2003 to 23/02/2005)
 Dr. Kamal Shrafi (From 30/04/2003 to 05/09/2003)
 Dr. Ahmad Shibi (From 29/10/2002 to 29/04/2003)
 Dr. Riyad Zanoun (From 05/03/1994 to 28/10/2002)

Health Minister of the Gaza Strip 
An alternative Palestinian Health Ministry led by the Hamas government in the Gaza Strip.

Mufiz al-Makhalati replaced Basem Naim, who served during the first Hamas cabinet.

References

External links
Official website 

1994 establishments in the Palestinian territories